Lithobiidae is a family of centipedes in the order Lithobiomorpha, containing the following genera:

Alaskobius  
Anodonthobius 
Archethopolys  
Arebius 
Arenobius 
Arkansobius
Atethobius 
Australobius
Banobius 
Bothropolys
Calcibius
Cerrobius 
Cruzobius 
Dakrobius 
Delobius 
Elattobius
Enarthrobius
Escimobius 
Ethopolys 
Eulithobius 
Eupolybothrus 
Friobius
Gallitobius
Garcibius
Garibius
Georgibius
Gonibius
Gosibius
Guambius
Guerrobius 
Harpolithobius
Helembius 
Hessebius 
Juanobius 
Kiberbius 
Labrobius
Liobius 
Lithobius
Llanobius 
Lobochaetotarsus 
Lophobius
Malbius
Mayobius
Metalithobius 
Mexicobius 
Mexicotarsus 
Monotarsobius
Nadabius 
Nampabius 
Neolithobius 
Nipponobius 
Nothembius
Nuevobius 
Oabius  
Ottobius
Paitobius  
Paobius
Pholobius
Photofugia
Physobius
Planobius 
Pleurolithobius
Pokabius 
Popobius 
Pseudolithobius 
Pterygotergum  
Schizotergitius 
Serrobius
Shosobius
Simobius 
Sonibius
Sotimpius
Sozibius
Taiyubius 
Texobius 
Tidabius 
Tigobius 
Tropobius 
Typhlobius
Uncobius 
Vulcanbius  
Watobius 
Zinapolys 
Zygethopolys

References

Centipede families
Lithobiomorpha